The Econometrics Journal was established in 1998 by the Royal Economic Society to promote the general advancement and application of econometric methods and techniques to problems of relevance to modern economics. It aims to publish high quality research papers relevant to contemporary econometrics in which primary emphasis is placed on important and original contributions of substantive direct or potential value in applications. It is particularly interested in path-breaking articles in econometrics and empirical economics that address leading cases rather than provide an exhaustive treatment.

The journal's editorial process of is overseen by its Managing Editor (Jaap Abbring) and Co-Editors (Victor Chernozhukov, Dennis Kristensen, Michael Jansson, Petra Todd), with the help of a Deputy Managing Editor (Tobias Klein) and an Editorial Office. The Editorial Board is complemented with a large number of first-rate econometricians from around the world who, as Associate Editors, act as ambassadors, advisors, and referees of the journal.

The journal is published by Oxford University Press on behalf of the Royal Economic Society. According to the Journal Citation Reports, the journal has a 2020 impact factor of 4.571.

References

External links 
 

Econometrics journals
Wiley-Blackwell academic journals
Triannual journals
Publications established in 1998
English-language journals